The following is a list of Army Books and Supplements for the various armies released for the Games Workshop Warhammer Fantasy Battle game.

An Army Book in the Warhammer Fantasy tabletop wargame, is a rules supplement containing information concerning a particular army, environment, or worldwide campaign.
Army Books for particular armies were introduced for the fourth edition of the game (prior to that all armies were included in the main rulebook). The sixth edition rendered these obsolete. Until superseded by newer versions, the 6th edition and later books remain valid for the newer editions of Warhammer.

Games Workshop has also released various expansions over the years, including a siege rules supplement and campaign expansions.  Expansions and Supplements may or may not be valid over multiple editions, though generally they cycle similarly to the Army Books.

An Army Book normally contains:

 Background - Information about the race and its place in the Warhammer world. This includes artwork, short stories, maps, timelines and copies of fictional documents.
 Bestiary - A list of the units, characters and war machines that can be chosen for use in a battle. This includes their characteristic values, information on their weapon options, and any limitations on their use, as well as background information on each unit. An Army's special magic lore (if applicable) and special magic items are listed here.
 Hobby section - Information on collecting, building and painting an army from the army book. This features outstanding example models painted by the Games Workshop 'Eavy Metal Team as well as Games Workshop's Army Painters and veteran hobbyists.
 Army List - Each entry from the bestiary is arranged by type (Lord, Hero, Core, Special, Rare) and given a points value, with more powerful units costing more points, so that battles are fought between balanced armies.  Options and costs are listed here.

Current Books
No Warhammer Fantasy Army books are considered current as in 2015 Games Workshop discontinued Warhammer: Fantasy Battle and replaced it with Warhammer: Age of Sigmar.

Army Books
8th Edition was the final edition of Warhammer: Fantasy Battle. The last army book to be printed was Wood Elves in 2014. The first army book; The Empire was printed for 4th edition rules in 1993 spanning some 21 years of printing of Warhammer army books for  The Game of Fantasy Battles (formerly known as Warhammer Fantasy Battle). The original Warhammer World was destroyed in a Warhammer Fantasy novels/in-game event called End Times in 2015.

8th Edition
8th Edition Army Books are hardcover and full color.  8th Edition was released July 2010.

Supplements

8th Edition

Expansions

Games Workshop and Warhammer Forge (the fantasy division of Forge World, a subsidiary of Games Workshop) have released expansions to the 8th edition game.

Battlescrolls
Games Workshop and the Black Library (the Publishing arm of GW) have released Battlescrolls for Warhammer Fantasy.  They are digitally released and expand the options available to players, as well as contain background on their subject.  Most are formations that can be added to any army as a unit outside of the normal army organization.  Some (noted below) are additions to specific army lists and are taken following the normal rules for their unit type.

Previous Edition Warhammer Army Books
Starting with the 4th edition rules, individual Army books were published for various races and realms of the Warhammer world that had coinciding miniatures armies to play the Warhammer Fantasy Battles tabletop game. Earlier versions of the Warhammer Fantasy Battle Game did not have individual Army books.

7th Edition
7th edition was released in September 2006.

6th Edition
6th Edition was released in October 2000.  All army books were initially replaced by a get-by list in Ravening Hordes, distributed for free.

In White dwarf magazines "Warhammer chronicles" there came preview army lists for Lizardmen (wd 256, April 2001), Bretonnia (wd261, September 2001), Wood elves (wd269, May 2002), and Beast of chaos (wd275, November 2002), that replaced their Ravening hordes list, and was replaced by their army books later in the 6th edition. Dogs of war got their main list and Regiments of renown -list in back to back issues (wd 251 and 252) that were never replaced. Daemon horde got same sort of preview army list in Annual 2002 (November 2001). The preview lists can be found in Annual 2002 and Chronicles 2003 in addition to White dwarf magazines.

5th Edition
5th Edition was released in October 1996.

4th Edition
4th Edition was released in October 1992.  It was the first edition to feature individual army books.

Supplements

6th edition

5th edition

4th edition

Warhammer supplements